Joseph W. Riordan, S.J. was appointed Santa Clara University's 11th president after the presidency of John Pinasco.

References

Gerald McKevitt, S.J. The University of Santa Clara: A History, 1851-1977 (Page 331)

1816 births
1897 deaths
19th-century Italian Jesuits
Presidents of Santa Clara University